Taekwondo at the 2004 Summer Olympics were held in the Sports Pavilion at the Faliro Coastal Zone Olympic Complex in Athens, Greece where 124 competitors competed in eight events, four each for men and women.

Qualification

Medal summary
The host nation Greece failed to add to the gold won by Michalis Mouroutsos at the 2000 Summer Olympics in Sydney, though Alexandros Nikolaidis and Elisavet Mystakidou both won silver. Chinese Taipei (i.e. Taiwan) won its first two gold medals ever at these events. Steven López of the United States and Chen Zhong of China each repeated as Olympic champions. Hadi Saei, Huang Chih-hsiung and Pascal Gentil also won medal for the second time.

Men's events

Women's events

Medal table

Participating nations
A total of 124 taekwondo jins from 60 nations competed at the Athens Games:

External links
Official result book – Taekwondo

 
2004 Summer Olympics events
2004